The Rarotonga monarch (Pomarea dimidiata), also known as the Rarotonga flycatcher or kakerori, is a species of bird in the monarch flycatcher family Monarchidae. It is endemic to the Cook Islands.

Taxonomy and systematics
The Rarotonga monarch was originally described in the genus Monarcha. Alternate names include Cook Island flycatcher, Cook Islands monarch, and Rarotonga monarch-flycatcher.

Description
The Rarotonga monarch is a most unusual bird in a number of ways, including being the only bird known to undergo sequential changes in plumage as it grows. The initial plumage of orange to orange-grey changes to pure grey when maturity is reached after four years.

Behaviour and ecology
Owing to its tropical oceanic island location, the Rarotonga monarch is exceptionally long-lived for a bird with a mass of only , having an adult survival of between 85 and 89 percent, a life expectancy of seven to nine years, and a maximum lifespan of around 24 years. These figures are comparable to large Australian passerines like the superb lyrebird or satin bowerbird and more than ten times the life expectancies of similar sized Holarctic songbirds.

Breeding
The extraordinary longevity of these birds may explain the evolution of helpers at the nest in a family where this feature is otherwise completely absent. Males can breed at one year, but do not do so in practice until they are four years old.

Threats
Since the introduction of the black rat and feral cat, adult mortality has more than doubled; a change sufficient to reduce what was previously a highly numerous bird to one of the most endangered birds in the world by the middle 1980s, when the Rarotonga monarch was listed as one of the highest conservation priorities among all Pacific Island birds. The annual pre-breeding removal of rats (starting in the late 1980s) from its principal breeding area on the south coast of Rarotonga (at the Takitumu Conservation Area) by staff and volunteers has made breeding significantly more successful: around two thirds of pairs assisted by a few helpers can now rear the normal clutch of two eggs, whereas in the 1980s breeding attempts had a success rate as low as eleven percent. Despite the growth in population, a major tropical cyclone could destroy this population growth with extreme swiftness, so that conservation work is still very important.

Status
The Rarotonga monarch was limited to Rarotonga until a second population was established on Atiu Island in 2001. In the 1990s its population was estimated at fewer than 30 birds in the wild. In 2022 the population was assessed at over 700 birds.

References

External links
BirdLife Species Factsheet.

Rarotonga monarch
Birds of the Cook Islands
Rarotonga
Rarotonga monarch
Taxonomy articles created by Polbot